Ageyevo is a rural locality (a village) in Vereshchaginsky District, Perm Krai, Russia. The population was 6 as of 2010.

Geography 
Ageyevo is located 26 km southwest of Vereshchagino, the district's administrative centre, by road. Borodulino is the nearest rural locality.

References 

Rural localities in Vereshchaginsky District